Stephen Duneier is an American professional investment manager, strategy consultant, speaker, lecturer, author, artist and Guinness World Record holder.

Education
Duneier attended the University of Florida from 1985 to 1987 before leaving to pursue a career in financial management with Drexel Burnham Lambert and then Prudential-Bache. He finished his undergraduate education at Florida Atlantic University with a BBA in finance and economics and received an MBA in finance and economics from New York University's Stern School of Business.

Career in finance
While still attending graduate school at NYU, Duneier worked as a foreign exchange option trader specializing in exotic derivatives at Credit Suisse in New York City. He was later hired by Bank of America to expand their foreign exchange business into European crosses and Emerging Markets and eventually promoted to Global Head of Currency Option Trading. Soon after Bank of America merged with Nations Bank, Duneier moved to AIG International where he was eventually named managing director in charge of Emerging Markets trading and based out of London, England. In 2002, Duneier launched a proprietary trading portfolio known as "TIP" for AIG International. Shortly after the firm merged with Banque AIG, Duneier became a global macro portfolio manager at London Diversified Fund Management in London and later at Peloton Partners in Santa Barbara, California. In 2008, he was one of the founding partners at Grant Capital Partners which grew to $1.25 billion in assets under management. He left in 2012 to launch Bija Capital Management and eventually Bija Advisors LLC, a consulting firm which advises experienced hedge fund managers, CIO's and asset allocators. Through Bija Advisors, he speaks on and publishes a subscription based newsletter covering topics on economics, cognitive science, and investment management. Duneier's book, AlphaBrain is released in March 2019 (Wiley & Sons).

Career as a cognitive science practitioner
In 2001, Duneier began to apply his approach to decision making, which he calls "Bija", to his personal life, leading to a long string of eccentric goals and resolutions being set and achieved. In 2012, it reached fever pitch when he embarked upon 12 for 2012, a New Year's resolution which included 12 Learning Resolutions and 12 Giving Resolutions. As part of his resolutions, he has performed at comedy clubs; learned to fly a helicopter; climbed iced waterfalls; raced cars; had root canal without anesthetic; learned to speak German; read 50 books in 52 weeks; participated in the Pier to Peak half marathon; learned to unicycle; used jumping stilts to hike; fostered a pit bull; built homes for families in Arizona; learned ballroom dancing, how to drum, slackline, parkour, skydive; and flown planes aerobatically.

He set the Guinness World Record for the largest crocheted granny square. It is 1,311 square feet, incorporates more than 30 miles of yarn and weighs over 60 pounds. It took  2 years, 7 months and 17 days to create, and required more than 500,000 double crochet stitches.

Duneier now speaks and writes about his experience and how others can take what we have learned from research conducted in the field of cognitive science in order to make better decisions and achieve bigger goals.

Career as a lecturer
Duneier teaches undergraduate and graduate level courses on Decision Analysis in the College of Engineering at the University of California in Santa Barbara.

Career as an artist
Duneier is an installation artist, part of the fiber-art movement known as Yarnbombing. His installations exist for just 9 days typically in Los Padres National Forest.

As part of his 2012 resolution to learn 12 new skills, Duneier learned how to knit. His first project was the covering of a 40-foot tall eucalyptus tree, 2.6 miles up the Cold Spring Trail in Santa Barbara, California. It required 450 square feet of knitted material. The installation remained for just 9 days and all material used was donated to Warm Up America, a charity in North Carolina.

The following year he wrapped a massive boulder atop the Saddlerock hiking trail above Montecito, California. 

His third installation was a large spiderweb made out of yarn which covered Sasquatch Cave in The Playgrounds at Lizard's Mouth. 

For his fourth installation, Duneier created a giant starfish made with reflective yarn from Red Heart Yarns and hung it 40 feet above the Seven Falls Trail. 

His fifth installation occurred at Santa Barbara City College where he laid out nearly 2,500 square feet of knitted and crocheted pieces on their lawn. 

For his sixth installation, he invited fiber artists from around the world to collaborate with him by sending crocheted and knitted pieces of any size, shape, color and style to participate. He received contributions from 388 artists in 36 countries and all 50 US States. Combined with his own work, he wrapped 18 giant boulders at Lizards Mouth in the Los Padres National Forest above Santa Barbara in California.

His most recent project was called the Alien Campsite where he incorporated additional materials including fiberglass, wood, and metal in addition to yarn. He created 10 aliens and 24 tents for the installation which lasted just 36 hours before being ripped apart by high winds in the canyon. The installation was permitted by the US Forest Service for the area just below the Davey Brown Trailhead. It incorporated Duneier's own work plus contributions from 656 fiber artists from 41 countries and all 50 states. 
Duneier's work is represented by the Sullivan Goss Gallery.

As part of his stated mission to build a global community kind and creative people, Duneier hosts the Yarnbomber podcast in which he features interviews with famous yarnbombers from around the world including Carol Hummel, London Kaye and Jessie Hemmons.

See also
 Cognitive bias
Land art
Site-Specific Art
Environmental art
Decision Analysis
Bija
Yarnbombing
Fiber art

References

External links
 Official Website of Bija Advisors LLC
 Official Website of Yarnbomber Stephen Duneier
 2012 New Year's Resolution Blog
 Official Website of The League of Professional Educators
 University of California Santa Barbara TMP Website

University of Florida alumni
New York University Stern School of Business alumni
Florida Atlantic University alumni
American financiers
American hedge fund managers
American investors
American management consultants
American money managers
American chief executives
American installation artists
21st-century American economists
Behavioral economists
Behavioral finance
American textile artists
Living people
1967 births